The Obtrusive Wife (Persian: Hamsare mozahem) is a 1953 Iranian comedy film directed by Serge Azaryan and Hassan Kheradmand and starring Sadegh Bahrami.

References

Bibliography 
 Mohammad Ali Issari. Cinema in Iran, 1900-1979. Scarecrow Press, 1989.

External links 
 

1953 films
1953 comedy films
Iranian comedy films
1950s Persian-language films
Iranian black-and-white films